Bala Kuh (also Romanized as Bālā Kūh) is a village in Juyom Rural District, Juyom District, Larestan County, Fars Province, Iran. At the 2006 census, its population was 90, in 16 families.

References 

Populated places in Larestan County